Lejeune Mbella Mbella (born July 9, 1949 in Nkongsamba) is a Cameroonian politician. He has served as the Minister of Foreign Affairs of Cameroon since October 2, 2015. Prior to his appointment he was the Ambassador Extraordinary and Plenipotentiary of Cameroon to France with residence in Paris.

References 

1949 births
Living people
Cameroonian politicians
People from Nkongsamba
Government ministers of Cameroon
21st-century Cameroonian politicians